Agdistis heydeni is a moth of the family Pterophoridae. It is known from western Asia, southern Europe, Hungary, Poland, North Africa and the Canary Islands.

The larvae feed on Atriplex halimus and Stachys glutinosa. Other recorded foodplants include Lamium, Origanum, Calamintha and Phlomis species.

Subspecies
Agdistis heydeni heydeni
Agdistis heydeni canariensis Rebel, 1896 (Canary Islands)

References

External links 

 Fauna Europaea
 Federmotten aus der Mongolei, Russland, der Türkei, der Balkanhalbinsel und Afrika, mit Beschreibung neuer Arten (Microlepidoptera: Pterophoridae)
 Faunistische Daten zur Verbreitung der Pterophoridae auf der Iberischen Halbinsel (Lepidoptera: Pterophoridae)
 papillon-poitou-charentes

Agdistinae
Moths of Europe
Moths described in 1852
Moths of Asia
Moths of Africa